The 2602 Class was a series of steam locomotives designed by William Dean and built at the Swindon Works of the Great Western Railway.

Design
They had outside frames to the six coupled driving wheels, but inside frames for the leading wheels. A distinctive visual feature, initially, was a large saddle-shaped sandbox over the first ring of the boiler. The class had two prototypes: No. 2601, which was a 4-6-0, while No. 2602 was a 2-6-0. These were built in 1899, and Nos. 2603-2610, all 2-6-0s, followed later, up to 1903. Though Dean was officially still in charge, Churchward's influence is evident in the rugged design. Their perhaps ironic nickname was after Paul Kruger, the Boer War leader defeated by Lord Roberts in 1900.

Problems
So the class was not long-lived and most were withdrawn around 1906. Several of the boilers were converted for stationary use in Swindon Works at reduced pressure, and remained in service there until the 1950s.

Aberdare class
Their numbers were adopted in 1907 by some of the last batch of the more elegant and reliable Aberdare Class 2-6-0s, which may also have re-used some of the "Kruger"s' parts.

References

Sources

External links
 Drawing of Kruger Class

2602
2-6-0 locomotives
4-6-0 locomotives
Railway locomotives introduced in 1899
Standard gauge steam locomotives of Great Britain
Scrapped locomotives